45.5842°, 1.7206°

The Arboretum de Chamberet (10 hectares) is an arboretum located in the Parc d'Angle, Chamberet, Corrèze, Limousin, France. It is open daily and admission is free. The arboretum contains 105 tree varieties, including species native to Limosin (beech, birch, oak, etc.) as well as exotic trees such as Araucaria araucana from Chile, bald cypress, and catalpas. It also includes some 60 varieties of fruit trees, bamboos, and two peat bogs.

See also 
 List of botanical gardens in France

References 
 Arboretum de Chamberet
 Practical Guide Corrèze description
 Je Decouvre La France description (French)
 Bois Foret description (French)

Chamberet, Arboretum de
Chamberet, Arboretum de